Vadym Valeriovich Shakhraychuk (born June 12, 1974), is a Ukrainian retired professional ice hockey player who has served as the Head Coach of the Ukrainian national team since 2021. 

He played for multiple teams in Russia, as well as with Sokil Kyiv in Ukraine. He played internationally for the Ukrainian national team at several World Championships, as well as the 2002 Winter Olympics.

Career statistics

Regular season and playoffs

International

External links
 

1974 births
Ak Bars Kazan players
Avangard Omsk players
HC Dynamo Moscow players
HC MVD players
HC Spartak Moscow players
HK ATEK Kyiv players
HKM Zvolen players
Ice hockey players at the 2002 Winter Olympics
Living people
Lokomotiv Yaroslavl players
Metallurg Magnitogorsk players
Nürnberg Ice Tigers players
Olympic ice hockey players of Ukraine
ShVSM Kyiv players
Sokil Kyiv players
Sportspeople from Kyiv
Traktor Chelyabinsk players
Ukrainian ice hockey coaches
Ukrainian ice hockey centres
Ukraine men's national ice hockey team coaches
Ukrainian expatriate sportspeople in Russia
Ukrainian expatriate sportspeople in Germany
Ukrainian expatriate sportspeople in Slovakia
Ukrainian expatriate ice hockey people
Expatriate ice hockey players in Germany
Expatriate ice hockey players in Russia
Expatriate ice hockey players in Slovakia